The 2000–01 BSC Young Boys season was the club's 103rd season in existence and the club's second consecutive season in the second division of Swiss football. In addition to the domestic league, Young Boys will participate in this season's edition of the Swiss Cup. The season covers the period from 1 July 2000 to 30 June 2001.

Pre-season and friendlies

Competitions

Overview

Nationalliga B

League table

Results summary

Results by round

Matches 

Source:

Promotion play-offs

Results summary

Results by round

Matches

Swiss Cup

References

External links 

BSC Young Boys seasons
Young Boys